Maxworthy is a hamlet north of North Petherwin in east Cornwall, England.

References

Hamlets in Cornwall